Blood Mountain is the third full-length studio album and major label debut by American heavy metal band Mastodon. The recording of the album finished in April 2006 and it was released on September 12 in the UK and September 12, 2006 in North America through Reprise Records. The album in full could be streamed at the band's MySpace page a few days prior to the release.

Like Mastodon's previous studio work Leviathan, Blood Mountain is a concept album. According to bassist Troy Sanders, "It's about climbing up a mountain and the different things that can happen to you when you're stranded on a mountain, in the woods, and you're lost. You're starving, hallucinating, running into strange creatures. You're being hunted. It's about that whole struggle." Guitarist Bill Kelliher considers this album to represent the earth element. At the time, bassist Troy Sanders called it "sonically the best album we have done." The band's emphasis on clean, melodic vocals instead of the harsher vocals that the band used on their early work continues to grow on this album.

The album includes guest appearances by Scott Kelly of Neurosis on "Crystal Skull", Josh Homme of Queens of the Stone Age on "Colony of Birchmen", as well as keyboard player Isaiah "Ikey" Owens of The Mars Volta and singer Cedric Bixler-Zavala of At the Drive-In and The Mars Volta on "Pendulous Skin" and "Siberian Divide", respectively.

Story notes
 The main character is in search of the Crystal Skull which he hopes to place at the top of Blood Mountain. In the making of DVD, the Crystal Skull is supposed to remove "the reptilian brain" causing its owner the ability to achieve the next step of human evolution.
 In an interview with bass guitarist Troy Sanders it was revealed that a Cysquatch is "a one-eyed Sasquatch that can see into the future." The Cysquatch warns the main character of the following dangers during his journey for the Crystal Skull.
 Several of the lyrics in "The Wolf is Loose" refer to chapter titles and themes in Joseph Campbell's The Hero With a Thousand Faces. The main character may be an example of a monomythical hero.

Track details
In earlier pressings, the album's last song, "Pendulous Skin", contains a secret "fan letter" from Josh Homme, who provided guest vocals on the album. At minute 21:25, he says: "Dear Mastodon: My name is Joshua. I'm a big fan from Southern Cal. Really diggin' on your new scene. That's why I hope you don't mind when I got your new demos for your new CD, I had to sing parts on them and send them to you as a tribute. I hope you're not mad about me also uploading them onto the Internet. But hell, it seems like you guys are so cool that you might dig something just like that. Sincerely, your fan, Joshua M. Homme. P.S., Keep it real...REAL (studio effects are used)....*laughter*....REAL."  When asked about the message in a Pitchfork Media interview, Homme said, "I was just fucking with them.  Then they asked if they could put that on the end of their record, and I was like, 'Yeah.'  I did the vocal [for "Colony of Birchmen"] and sent it back to them, and that message was before the song started." The song itself ends at 5:03, followed by over 16 minutes of silence, then Homme's message.

The title "Colony of Birchmen" is an homage to the song "The Colony of Slippermen" by progressive rock group Genesis, whom the band's drummer, Brann Dailor, has been known to appreciate.

Music videos for "The Wolf Is Loose", "Colony of Birchmen", "Sleeping Giant" and "Capillarian Crest" have been made. Although the video for "Capillarian Crest" is made up of live footage, the studio version of the song is played. The track "Sleeping Giant" is available as downloadable content for Guitar Hero III: Legends of Rock, and "Colony of Birchmen" is an on-disc track in Rock Band 2.

Critical reception

Blood Mountain was released to high critical praise. At Metacritic, which assigns a rating out of 100 to reviews from mainstream critics, the album has received a score of 82, based on 24 reviews. Total Guitar magazine voted it Number One album of 2006, and magazines such as Metal Hammer and Kerrang! thought it is every bit as good as the band's previous album Leviathan, if not better. The album has also charted in many websites and magazines 2006 countdowns.

Blood Mountain was voted the best album of 2006 in the UK Metal Hammer magazine end-of year polls, as well as top in Total Guitar magazine's top 50 albums of 2006. It was also rated the 17th greatest metal album of all time by a countdown carried out by gaming website IGN in 2010.

In 2006, the album was nominated for a Danish Metal Award for Best International Metal album, but the award eventually went to Satyricon's Now Diabolical. That same year, the song "Colony of Birchmen" was nominated for a Grammy Award for Best Metal Performance, but lost to Slayer's Eyes of the Insane.

Commercial performance
Blood Mountain entered the Billboard 200 best selling album charts at No. 32, with 24,000 sold copies, marking it the third highest debut in the band's career before Crack the Skye and The Hunter. The album is also one of the band's highest selling effort to date. By December 2006, the album had sold more than 65,000 copies in the U.S. alone according to the band's website, by March 2009, the album had sold 150,000 copies in the U.S. according to Nielsen Soundscan, and by September 2010 it had sold 176,000 copies.

Track listing

Personnel
Mastodon
 Troy Sanders – bass, vocals
 Brent Hinds – lead guitar, vocals, rhythm guitar on "Sleeping Giant"
 Bill Kelliher – rhythm guitar, lead guitar on "Sleeping Giant", backing vocals
 Brann Dailor – drums, percussion, backing vocals

Guest musicians
 Scott Kelly – guest vocals and additional lyrics on "Crystal Skull"
 Josh Homme – guest vocals on "Colony of Birchmen"
 Cedric Bixler-Zavala – guest vocals on "Siberian Divide"
 Isaiah "Ikey" Owens – keyboards on "Pendulous Skin"

Technical personnel
 Matt Bayles – production, engineering
 Rich Costey – mixing
 Vlado Meller – mastering
 Eric Searle and Michael Green – pre-production

Charts

Album

Singles

Certifications

References

2006 albums
Mastodon (band) albums
Reprise Records albums
Warner Records albums
Concept albums
Sludge metal albums
Albums produced by Matt Bayles
Albums recorded at Robert Lang Studios